The 1884 United States presidential election in Iowa took place on November 4, 1884. All contemporary 38 states were part of the 1884 United States presidential election. State voters chose 13 electors to the Electoral College, which selected the president and vice president.

Iowa was won by Secretary of State James G. Blaine (R-Maine), running with Senator John A. Logan, with 52.25% of the vote, against Grover Cleveland, the 28th governor of New York, (D–New York), running with the former governor of Indiana Thomas A. Hendricks, with 47.01% of the popular vote.

The Prohibition party chose the 8th Governor of Kansas, John St. John and Maryland State Representative William Daniel, received 0.40% of the popular vote.

Results

Results by county

See also
 United States presidential elections in Iowa

References

Iowa
1884
1884 Iowa elections